Owen Allison (born 24 August 1949) is a Jamaican cricketer. He played in three first-class matches for the Jamaican cricket team in 1972/73.

See also
 List of Jamaican representative cricketers

References

External links
 

1949 births
Living people
Jamaican cricketers
Jamaica cricketers
People from Spanish Town